John Adrian Louis Hope, 1st Baron Glendevon, PC (7 April 1912 – 18 January 1996), known as Lord John Hope from 1912 to 1964, was a British aristocrat and Tory politician.

Early life
Hope was the younger son of Victor Hope, 2nd Marquess of Linlithgow, and Doreen Maud Milner. His elder twin brother was Charles Hope, 3rd Marquess of Linlithgow. He was educated at Ludgrove, Eton and Christ Church, Oxford and served in the Second World War in Norway and Italy with the Scots Guards, achieving the rank of temporary Major. He was twice mentioned in despatches.

Political career
In 1945 Hope was elected Member of Parliament for Midlothian and Peebles North, a seat he held until 1950, and then represented Edinburgh Pentlands from 1950 to 1964.

Hope served in the Conservative administrations of Winston Churchill, Anthony Eden and Harold Macmillan as Joint Parliamentary Under-Secretary of State for Foreign Affairs from 1954 to 1956, as Parliamentary Under-Secretary of State for Commonwealth Relations from 1956 to 1957 and as Joint Parliamentary Under-Secretary of State for Scotland from 1957 to 1959. In 1959 he was appointed Minister of Works and invested a Privy Counsellor. Hope remained as head of the Ministry of Works until 1962. In 1964 he was raised to the peerage as Baron Glendevon, of Midhope in the County of Linlithgow.

Personal life
Lord Glendevon married Elizabeth Paravicini (1915–1998), the former wife of Vincent Paravicini and the only child of the author W. Somerset Maugham, in 1948. They had two sons. Lord Glendevon died on 18 January 1996, aged 83, and was succeeded in the barony by his eldest son, Julian.

References

Kidd, Charles, Williamson, David (editors). Debrett's Peerage and Baronetage (1990 edition). New York: St Martin's Press, 1990,

External links
 

1912 births
1996 deaths
British Army personnel of World War II
Scots Guards officers
People educated at Eton College
Hope, John
Conservative Party (UK) hereditary peers
Members of the Privy Council of the United Kingdom
British Secretaries of State
Younger sons of marquesses
Hope, John
Hope, John
Hope, John
Hope, John
Hope, John
Hope, John
John
Hope, John
Hope, John
Hereditary barons created by Elizabeth II
Ministers in the Eden government, 1955–1957
Ministers in the Macmillan and Douglas-Home governments, 1957–1964
Alumni of Christ Church, Oxford
Scottish twins
People educated at Ludgrove School